TOI-1338 is a binary star system located in the constellation Pictor, about 1,320 light-years from Earth. It is orbited by the circumbinary planet TOI-1338 b, discovered by the Transiting Exoplanet Survey Satellite (TESS).

Nomenclature and history
The acronym TOI stands for "TESS Objects of Interest." The planet was found in the summer of 2019 by Wolf Cukier, a 17-year-old attending Scarsdale High School in New York at the time, who joined the Goddard Space Flight Center as a summer intern. He looked through light curves that were flagged as eclipsing binaries by volunteers of the Planet Hunters citizen science project. Cukier and six of the Planet Hunter volunteers are co-authors of the publication regarding the newly-discovered planet. Cukier currently attends Princeton University as an undergraduate student in the Department of Astrophysical Sciences.

Cukier was not given an opportunity to name the planet. In February 2021, a petition calling for the planet TOI-1338 b in the system to be named SOPHIE received over 90,000 signatures. Organisers of the petition sought to pay homage to the late Scottish musician and music producer Sophie, who died on 30 January 2021. High-profile supporters of the campaign included Charli XCX and Caroline Polachek.

The stellar binary 

TOI-1338 is a single-lined spectroscopic binary system, consisting of an F8 star and a red dwarf of spectral type M. The system has an age of 4.4 billion years.  The two stars with masses of 1.13 and 0.313  revolve around each other every 14.6 days.  The red dwarf is about nine magnitudes fainter than the primary star and cannot be detected in the spectrum.

The orbit of the two stars is inclined at 89.7° and both primary and secondary eclipses can be observed, although the brightness changes are very small.  The primary eclipse occurs when the hotter primary star is partially occulted by the cooler secondary.  It lasts about five hours and the brightness decreases by about 4%.  The secondary eclipses occur when the cooler star is occulted by the hotter star.  They also last about five hours but the brightness drops by less than half a percent.

Planetary system

The planet TOI-1338b is between Neptune and Saturn in size, and has an orbit that is within ~1° coplanar with the binary. The spin of the primary star also aligns with the orbits of the binary and the planet (spin-orbit angle β =  °). This is the second time the Rossiter–McLaughlin effect was measured for a star hosting a circumbinary planet. Kepler-16 was the first system with such a measurement. The measurement of the alignment for TOI-1338 suggests that the planet formed from a single circumbinary disk.
The second circumbinary planet was discovered by radial velocity method in 2023.

See also
 TOI-700
 TOI-849 b

References

External links 
 TESS – Official WebSite
 NASA Telescope Discovers Its First Planet Orbiting Two Stars
TOI 1338 at ExoFOP TESS
The TOI 1338 subject at Planet Hunters, as mentioned in the paper

Planetary systems with two confirmed planets
1338, TOI
Pictor (constellation)
Eclipsing binaries
F-type main-sequence stars
M-type main-sequence stars